Jan Rzepecki alias „Prezes” (29 September 1899 in Warsaw – 28 April 1983) was a Polish soldier and military historian, colonel of the Polish Army. Commander of the Bureau of Information and Propaganda of Home Army from 1940 to 1945. After World War II commander of the Armed Forces Delegation for Poland and the first president of the Freedom and Independence.

References 

1899 births
1983 deaths
Military personnel from Warsaw
People from Warsaw Governorate
Polish opinion journalists
Cursed soldiers
Polish anti-communists
Polish people of the Polish–Soviet War
Warsaw Uprising insurgents
Polish legionnaires (World War I)
Polnische Wehrmacht personnel
Recipients of the Cross of Independence
Recipients of the Silver Cross of the Virtuti Militari
Recipients of the Gold Cross of the Virtuti Militari
Recipients of the Cross of Valour (Poland)
Recipients of the Gold Cross of Merit (Poland)
Burials at Powązki Military Cemetery
Prisoners of Oflag II-C